Petre Sucitulescu (died 20 September 1941) was a Romanian football defender and a World War II soldier. Sucitulescu was one of the five players who played for Unirea Tricolor București and were incorporated to fight for the Romanian Armed Forces in World War II. With the exception of Constantin Anghelache, the others, Gicu Cristescu, Traian Ionescu and Andrei Alecu died. In September 1941 Sucitulescu died while fighting in Dalnik on the Eastern Front.

International career
Petre Sucitulescu played four games at international level for Romania. He made his debut at the 1934–35 Balkan Cup under coach Alexandru Săvulescu, playing in two games, the first one was a 3–2 victory against Bulgaria and the second was a 4–0 loss against Yugoslavia. His following two games were at the 1935 Balkan Cup, appearing in a 2–0 loss against Yugoslavia and in 4–0 loss against Bulgaria.

Honours
Unirea Tricolor București
Divizia B: 1938–39
Cupa României runner-up: 1935–36

Notes

References

External links
Petre Sucitulescu player profile at Labtof.ro

Year of birth missing
1941 deaths
Romanian footballers
Romania international footballers
Association football defenders
Liga I players
Liga II players
Unirea Tricolor București players
Olympia București players
FC Sportul Studențesc București players
Romanian military personnel killed in World War II
Romanian military personnel of World War II